Judd Matheny (born April 9, 1970) is a Republican party politician in Tennessee, who most recently represented the 47th district as state representative. His district included all or parts of Coffee, Warren counties. He served in the state house from 2002 to 2018. He succeeded Doyle Lewis Jr.

Biography
Judd Matheny was born on April 9, 1970.

Matheny enlisted with the Tennessee Army National Guard at Winchester, Tennessee and graduated from Tullahoma High School in Tullahoma, Tennessee during 1988. Matheny would remain as a member within the Tennessee Army National Guard up to 1995.

Matheny was employed as a reserve deputy sheriff by the Putnam County Sheriff’s Department during 1990 through 1991, and he afterward began working as a full-time police officer with the City of Baxter, Tennessee from 1991 through 1993 before hiring on during 1994 with the Tennessee Alcoholic Beverage Commission as a special agent, where he worked within many liquor and narcotic related duties up through 1998.

Beginning in 1998, Matheny was president and founder of Advanced Protective Services, Inc. APS, Inc. specialized in private investigations, executive protection, electronic surveillance and counter-surveillance, training and security consulting to a number of prominent corporations doing business in the Nashville, Tennessee area and employed approximately thirty full-time, armed guards and about "250 police officers in an off-duty, uniformed capacity." Matheny later retired from APS, Inc. and sold this business during August, 2002.

Matheny later completed  his Bachelor of Science correspondence degree in Criminal Justice and Political Science from Excelsior University (based in Albany, New York) during 2000.

Matheny has previously been the chairman of the Coffee County Republican Party. and is also a member of the Chambers of Commerce of Tullahoma, Manchester, and McMinnville. He is also a member of the National Rifle Association, the National Wild Turkey Federation, and Quail Unlimited. He is a Master Mason, and a member of the Tullahoma Rotary Club.

Matheny is a Methodist. He has two children, Abigail and Aulden.

Matheny endorsed Rick Perry in the Republican primary for the 2012 presidential election. He endorsed Ted Cruz in the  Republican primary for the 2016 presidential election. In 2017, Matheny announced that he would run for Tennessee's 6th congressional district in 2018.

References

1970 births
Living people
Excelsior College alumni
Republican Party members of the Tennessee House of Representatives
American Lutherans
Methodists from Tennessee
American deputy sheriffs
American municipal police officers
21st-century American politicians
Tennessee National Guard personnel